Trigonella is a genus from the family Fabaceae. The best known member is the herb fenugreek. Members of the genus occur naturally in the Canary Islands, southern Europe, nontropical Africa, western and central Asia, the Indian subcontinent, and Australia.

Species
Currently accepted species include:

Trigonella adscendens (Nevski) Afan. & Gontsch.
Trigonella afghanica Vassilcz.
Trigonella anguina Delile
Trigonella aphanoneura Rech.f.
Trigonella arabica Delile
Trigonella aristata Vassilcz.
Trigonella bactriana Vassilcz.
Trigonella badachschanica Afan.
Trigonella bakhtiarica Ranjbar & Z.Hajmoradi
Trigonella balachowskyi Leredde
Trigonella balansae Boiss. & Reut.
Trigonella berythea Boiss. & Blanche
Trigonella binaloudensis Ranjbar & Karamian
Trigonella cachemiriana Cambess.
Trigonella caelesyriaca Boiss.
Trigonella caerulea (L.) Ser.
Trigonella calliceras Fisch. ex M.Bieb.
Trigonella capitata Boiss.
Trigonella cariensis Boiss.
Trigonella cassia Boiss.
Trigonella cedretorum Vassilcz.
Trigonella cephalotes Boiss. & Balansa
Trigonella cilicica Hub.-Mor.
Trigonella coerulescens (M.Bieb.) Halácsy
Trigonella corniculata (L.) L.
Trigonella cretica (L.) Boiss.
Trigonella cylindracea Desv.
Trigonella dasycarpa (Ser.) Vassilcz.
Trigonella disperma Bornm.
Trigonella edelbergii (Širj. & Rech.f.) Rech.f.
Trigonella elliptica Boiss.
Trigonella emodi Benth.
Trigonella falcata Balf.f.
Trigonella filipes Boiss.
Trigonella fimbriata Royle ex Benth.
Trigonella foenum-graecum L.
Trigonella freitagii Vassilcz.
Trigonella gharuensis Rech.f.
Trigonella glabra Thunb.
Trigonella gladiata Steven ex M.Bieb.
Trigonella gontscharovii Vassilcz.
Trigonella gracilis Benth.
Trigonella graeca (Boiss. & Spruner) Boiss.
Trigonella grandiflora Bunge
Trigonella griffithii Boiss.
Trigonella heratensis Rech.f.
Trigonella hierosolymitana Boiss.
Trigonella ionantha Rech.f.
Trigonella iskanderi Vassilcz.
Trigonella kafirniganica Vassilcz.
Trigonella khalkhalica Ranjbar & Z.Hajmoradi
Trigonella koeiei Širj. & Rech.f.
Trigonella korovinii Vassilcz.
Trigonella kotschyi Fenzl ex Boiss.
Trigonella laciniata L.
Trigonella lasiocarpa Ranjbar & Z.Hajmoradi
Trigonella late-alata (Bornm.) Vassilcz.
Trigonella laxiflora Aitch. & Baker
Trigonella laxissima Vassilcz.
Trigonella lilacina Boiss.
Trigonella linczevskii Vassilcz.
Trigonella lipskyi Širj.
Trigonella lycica Hub.-Mor.
Trigonella macrorrhyncha Boiss.
Trigonella marco-poloi Vassilcz.
Trigonella maritima Delile ex Poir.
Trigonella media Delile ex Urb.
Trigonella mesopotamica Hub.-Mor.
Trigonella obcordata Benth.
Trigonella occulta Delile ex Ser.
Trigonella pamirica Boriss.
Trigonella platyphylla Sam. ex Rech.f.
Trigonella podlechii Vassilcz.
Trigonella podperae (Širj.) Vassilcz.
Trigonella procumbens (Besser) Rchb.
Trigonella pseudocapitata Contandr. & Quézel
Trigonella pycnotricha Rech.f.
Trigonella raphanina Boiss.
Trigonella rechingeri Širj.
Trigonella rotundifolia (Sm.) Strid
Trigonella salangensis Vassilcz.
Trigonella schlumbergeri Boiss.
Trigonella × schweinfurthiana Muschl.
Trigonella × sickenbergeriana Muschl.
Trigonella siunica Vassilcz.
Trigonella smyrnea Boiss.
Trigonella spicata Sm.
Trigonella spinosa L.
Trigonella spruneriana Boiss.
Trigonella squarrosa Vassilcz.
Trigonella stellata Forssk.
Trigonella stenocarpa Rech.f.
Trigonella stipitata Ranjbar & Joharchi
Trigonella strangulata Boiss.
Trigonella striata L.f.
Trigonella suavissima Lindl.
Trigonella subenervis Rech.f.
Trigonella teheranica Bornm.
Trigonella torbatejamensis Ranjbar
Trigonella turkmena Popov
Trigonella uncinata Banks & Sol.
Trigonella velutina Boiss.
Trigonella velutinoides Hub.-Mor.
Trigonella verae Širj.
Trigonella xeromorpha Rech.f.
Trigonella yasujensis Ranjbar, Z.Hajmoradi & Karamian
Trigonella zaprjagaevii Afan. & Gontsch.

References

Trifolieae
Fabaceae genera